Linae Foster was the D&D Licensing Manager at Wizards of the Coast, and part of the production staff for the fourth edition of Dungeons & Dragons.

Career
Linae Foster, Licensing Manager for Dungeons & Dragons at Wizards of the Coast, and D&D Brand Manager Scott Rouse, created a new Open Gaming License (OGL) after the departure of its creator Ryan Dancey. Rouse and Foster worked on a new OGL to support the fourth edition of Dungeons & Dragons beginning in 2007. On January 2, 2008, Foster posted an update for the upcoming 4th edition version of the OGL, which would require a fee from publishers to for the right to publish books after the release of 4th edition. Later that year, Foster was laid off and the company eliminated the Licensing Manager position.

References

American businesspeople
Living people
Place of birth missing (living people)
Year of birth missing (living people)